The election of the Governor of the Commonwealth of Pennsylvania occurs when voters in the U.S. Commonwealth of Pennsylvania select the Governor and Lieutenant Governor for the ensuing four years beginning at noon on the third Tuesday of January following the election. Pennsylvania gubernatorial elections were held triennially beginning with the first election in 1790 until 1878. Gubernatorial elections have been held quadrennially since the election of 1882. Gubernatorial general elections are held on Election Day, coinciding with various other federal, statewide, and local races.

Per Article II of the 1790 Pennsylvania Constitution, gubernatorial elections were held triennially on the second Tuesday of October, with the three-year term commencing on the third Tuesday of December immediately following the election. Incumbents were permitted to serve for a maximum of nine years out of any period of twelve years. Ties were to be resolved, pursuant to the same document, by a joint vote of the Pennsylvania General Assembly, consisting of the House of Representatives and the Senate. The 1874 Pennsylvania Constitution mandated the date of gubernatorial elections to be likewise that of the general election on Election Day in November and extended the term to four years, beginning on the third Tuesday of January following the election. In the original text of the 1874 Constitution, an incumbent governor was prohibited from running for a second successive term, but this was amended in 1967 to permit an incumbent to do so. The next gubernatorial election in Pennsylvania is scheduled to be held on November 3, 2026.

The list below contains election returns from all sixty-seven gubernatorial elections in Pennsylvania sorted by year, beginning with the first in 1790 and ending with the most recent in 2022. Incumbent governors are listed as well as elected governors and runner(s)-up in each election, including major third-party candidates (garnering 5% or more of the popular vote). Parties are color-coded to the left of a Governor's or candidate's name according to the key below. The popular vote and percentage margins listed in the "Margin" column are the differences between the total votes received and percentage of the popular vote received by the top two finishers in the corresponding election (i.e. the margin-of-victory of an elected governor over the nearest competitor).

List of elections
 Parties

See also
List of governors of Pennsylvania
List of United States Senate elections in Pennsylvania
List of United States presidential elections in Pennsylvania
Elections in Pennsylvania
Government of Pennsylvania

Notes

References

External links
Pennsylvania Department of State Election Returns Portal
Pennsylvania Gubernatorial Election Returns (1789-2003) from the Wilkes University Election Statistics Project

Elections
Governors
 
Lists of elections in the United States